Moothakurichi is a village located in Madukkur Town Panchayat, Pattukkottai taluk, Thanjavur District, Tamil Nadu State, India. It is one of the villages in Musugundhanadu. It is the fifth largest village by area in Pattukkottai taluk. Total geographical area of the village is 718.67 hectares.

Demographics 

As per the 2001 census, Moothakurichi had a total population of 2865 with 1317 males and 1548 females. The sex ratio was 1175. The literacy rate was 73.57.
This village is a small rural population unit, held together by common economic and political ties. Based on agricultural production, a village is smaller than a town and has been the normal unit of community living in most areas of the world throughout history while the traditional occupation is agriculture.

The village community consists of a group of people, possibly linked by blood, using land, sometimes held communally, for cultivation and pasturage.

Moothakurichi is the head of the village panchayat for the near by villages such as Kandiyankadu and Silambavelankadu.

Culture

Festivals and Traditions 

Pongal, also called as Tamizhar Thirunaal (festival of Tamils) or Makara Sankranti elsewhere in India, a four-day harvest festival is one of the most widely celebrated festivals throughout Tamil Nadu. The Tamil language saying Thai Pirandhal Vazhi Pirakkum — literally meaning, the birth of the month of Thai will pave way for new opportunities – is often quoted with reference to this festival. 
The first day, Bhogi Pongal, the male or their heir will give money or things as gift to their sisters after the marriage of their sister. Though the brother is not available physically, the family of the male will continue the practice till the end of the sister of his father (அத்தை/ நாத்தனார்). The second day, Surya Pongal, is the main day which falls on the first day of the tenth Tamil month Thai (14 January or 15 January in western calendar). 
The third day, Maattu Pongal, is meant to offer thanks to the cattle, as they provide milk and are used to plough the lands.
The fourth day, kaanum pongal, in our village every year we conducted the games to all age peoples and provide prizes also

More about culture and festivals may be obtained from this link in Tamil language (Tamil: Moothakurichi culture ) and Moothakurichi festivals)

Education 
More about Education, Graduates and Diplomates in detailed at (Tamil: Moothakurichi Education)

School 
Moothakurichi village is more famous for government high school, in every year in this school scored 100% of pass marks. Facilities of schools have access to the latest in computer and informational technology, as well as science, and score marks higher in state level also. The education systems also have a full schedule of extracurricular activities like games and others. According to education as a power to cultivate and develop human potential has very little to do with these things. It has everything to do with awakening the minds of children, evoking their enthusiastic interest in the world around them, and releasing their curiosity and creative energies for 10th standard students, staff conducts special classes and coaching for students to score good marks in SSLC board exam.

Economy 
Thanjavur is known as the "Rice bowl of Tamil Nadu". Till the end of 2000s, the majority of the land was cultivated by paddy, groundnut. But due to lack of water resources and labors maximum area should be planted by coconut trees..

During the Gaja cyclone, nearly 90% of the coconut trees were fell down. Coconut tree is the economic backbone of the people. In a sudden night, the village was totally made upside down. But the people didn't loose the hope and the self belief. By God's grace and the hard work of the people, we will made it again.

Most of the people in the village  (at least one or two members in each family) are in foreign soil. Mostly the people are earning in UAE, SINGAPORE, MALAYSIA and some people are living  in UK, France, Canada, Poland, Mexico, Belgium and USA.

The people in the villages are well educated and most of the youngsters complete Engineering or medical degrees.

In the last ten years (after 2000) there is a sudden rise in the economy of the people. Before that most of the houses are built by using coconut leaves i.e., hut. Now all the houses are built by concrete.

References 
 
மூத்தாக்குறிச்சி கிராமம்
Moothakurichi Village Government High School in Tamil
Moothakurichi Village Government High School in Tamil
Website to list of schools in Moothakurichi
of Panchayat Raj, Government of India
Taluk Villages Information about Moothakurichi
Dinamani online newspaper 
kasangadu village

Villages in Thanjavur district